Razdolnoye is a rural locality (a selo) and the administrative center of Razdolnensky Selsoviet of Tambovsky District, Amur Oblast, Russia. The population was 1,750 as of 2018. There are 21 streets.

Geography 
Razdolnoye is located 21 km southwest of Tambovka (the district's administrative centre) by road. Roshchino is the nearest rural locality.

References 

Rural localities in Tambovsky District, Amur Oblast